Barcus Glacier is a glacier in the Hutton Mountains that drains east-southeast, to the north of Mount Nash and Mount Light, into Keller Inlet in Palmer Land. It was mapped by the United States Geological Survey from ground surveys and from U.S. Navy air photos, 1961–67, and named by the Advisory Committee on Antarctic Names for James R. Barcus, ionospheric physics researcher at Byrd Station in the summers of 1966–67 and 1967–68.

See also
 List of glaciers in the Antarctic
 Glaciology

References
 

Glaciers of Palmer Land